Live at The Starland Ballroom is a double DVD/CD from progressive rock quartet Coheed and Cambria, released on March 22, 2005. The concert was filmed August 20, 2004 at the Starland Ballroom in Sayreville, New Jersey. The New York City radio station, 92.3 K-Rock put on the show and sold tickets for 92 cents. They sold out almost immediately.

The album was certified Gold by The RIAA on October 31, 2005, for domestic sales exceeding 50,000 copies for a video longform format.

Track listing

Some of the special features on the DVD are:
Three music videos (A Favor House Atlantic, Devil In Jersey City, and Blood Red Summer)
A short documentary on the making of the Blood Red Summer music video
Live performance from the 2004 Skate and Surf Festival
Interview with Claudio and Travis. 
Interview with Mic and Josh at ["Blizzard '05"]

References

External links
Amazon.com page

Coheed and Cambria albums
2005 live albums
Equal Vision Records live albums
2005 video albums
Live video albums
Equal Vision Records video albums